BPI fold containing family B, member 1 (BPIFB1) is a protein that in humans is encoded by the BPIFB1 gene. BPIFB1 is a secreted protein, expressed at very high levels in mucosa of the airways (respiratory and olfactory epithelium) and salivary glands, and at moderate levels in the digestive tract (tongue, stomach, intestinal epithelium) and pancreas.

Superfamily 

BPIFB1 is a member of a BPI fold protein superfamily defined by the presence of the bactericidal/permeability-increasing protein fold (BPI fold) which is formed by two similar domains in a "boomerang" shape.  This superfamily is also known as the BPI/LBP/PLUNC family or the BPI/LPB/CETP family. The BPI fold creates apolar binding pockets that can interact with hydrophobic and amphipathic molecules, such as the acyl carbon chains of lipopolysaccharide found on Gram-negative bacteria, but members of this family may have many other functions.  

Genes for the BPI/LBP/PLUNC superfamily are found in all vertebrate species, including distant homologs in non-vertebrate species such as insects, mollusks, and roundworms. Within that broad grouping is the BPIF gene family whose members encode the BPI fold structural motif and are found clustered on a single chromosome, e.g., Chromosome 20 in humans, Chromosome 2 in mouse, Chromosome 3 in rat, Chromosome 17 in pig, Chromosome 13 in cow. The BPIF gene family is split into two groupings, BPIFA and BPIFB. In humans, BIPFA consists of 3 protein encoding genes BPIFA1, BPIFA2, BPIFA3, and 1 pseudogene BPIFA4P; while BPIFB consists of 5 protein encoding genes BPIFB1, BPIFB2, BPIFB3, BPIFB4, BPIFB6 and 2 pseudogenes BPIFB5P, BPIFB9P. What appears as pseudogenes in humans may appear as fully functional genes in other species.

BPIFB1 was also identified as the LPLUNC1 gene (long-palate lung and nasal epithelium clone 1) in mouse, but subsequently PLUNC proteins were classified as a subfamily of the BPI fold superfamily. In a systematic analysis of the chicken genome, the Lplunc1(Bpifb1) / Lplunc5(Bpifb5) branch of the gene family was determined to be absent, therefore BPIFB1 and BPIFB5 proteins likely arose only after the speciation of mammals.

Function 

In mammals, the BPIFB1 protein is involved in the innate immune response to bacterial exposure in the mucosa of the mouth, nasal cavities, lungs, and digestive tract. It has a role in sensing and responding to Gram-negative bacteria and contributes to anti-bacterial activity. 

In humans it is abnormally expressed in a respiratory diseases such as cystic fibrosis (CF), chronic obstructive pulmonary disease (COPD), and asthma. It is also differentially in tumors such as nasopharyngeal carcinoma (NPC), gastric cancer, salivary gland tumors, and lung cancer therefore BPIFB1 has been considered to be a therapeutic target for these conditions. For example, BPIFB1 expression is suppressed in NPC but when the gene is over-expressed in cell cultures and in mice, tumor cell migration  and invasion (metastases) is reduced.

Model organisms 

Model organisms have been used in the study of BPIFB1 function. A conditional knockout mouse line called Bpifb1tm1e(KOMP)Wtsi was generated at the Wellcome Trust Sanger Institute. Male and female animals underwent a standardized phenotypic screen to determine the effects of deletion. Additional screens performed:  in-depth immunological phenotyping and in-depth bone and cartilage phenotyping.

References

External links

Further reading 

 
 
 
 
 
 
 

Human proteins
Genes
Genes on human chromosome 20